Sailing/Yachting is an Olympic sport starting from the Games of the 1st Olympiad (1896 Olympics in Greece. With the exception of 1904 and the canceled 1916 Summer Olympics, sailing has always been included on the Olympic schedule. The Sailing program of 1956 consisted of a total of five sailing classes (disciplines). For each class seven races were scheduled from 26 November to 5 December 1956 at Port Phillip Bay.

The sailing was done on the triangular type Olympic courses. The start was made in the center of a set of 8 numbered marks that were places in a circle. During the starting procedure the sequence of the marks was communicated to the sailors. By picking the mark that was most upwind the start could always be made upwind. This system is, at least in certain German lakes, still in use.

Venue 

One can enter the bay from the Southern Ocean a narrow gap of about 3 km. Therefore, the course areas are almost free of tidal streams. However, there is a 0.5 m tidal rise.
The winds are ideal for sailing. The predominant southerlies generates light airs in the morning.

Three circular courses were planned for the northern end of Port Phillip Bay, each using the 1936 system with 8 fixed buoy's with the start in the middle of the circle.

Competition

Overview

Continents 
 Africa
 Asia
 Australian continent
 Europe
 Americas

Countries

Classes (equipment) 
{|class="wikitable" style="text-align:center"
 |-
 |colspan="10"|
 |-
 ! Class !! Type !! Event !! Sailors !! Trapeze !! Mainsail !! Jib/Genoa !! Spinnaker !! First OG !! Olympics so far
 |-
 |style="text-align:left"| Finn || Dinghy ||  || 1 || 0 || + || – || – || 1952 || 2 
 |-
 |style="text-align:left"| 12m2 Sharpie  || Dinghy ||  || 2 || 0 || + || + || – || 1956 || 1
 |-
 |style="text-align:left"| Star || Keelboat ||  || 2 || 0 || + || + || – || 1932 || 5
 |-
 |style="text-align:left"| Dragon || Keelboat ||  || 3 || 0 || + || + || + || 1948 || 3
 |-
 |style="text-align:left"| 5.5 Metre || Keelboat ||  || 3 || 0 || + || + || + || 1952 || 2
 |-
 |colspan="10"|'Legend:  = Male,  = Female,  = Open
|}

 Medal summary 

 Medal table 

 Remarks 

 Olympic boycott 
1956 was the first time in history that several countries decided to boycott the Olympics. The boycott that influenced the sailing the most was probably that of The Netherlands, Spain, and Switzerland. They withdrew to protest against the Soviet Union invasion of Hungary during the 1956 Hungarian Revolution and Soviet presence at the Games. At that time The Netherlands dominated at the International competition in the 12m2 Sharpie.

 Sailing 
 This Olympic sailing event was gender independent, but turned out to be a Men-only event. This was one of the triggers to create gender specific events. This however had to wait until 1988.
 Classes were hosted by several local yacht clubs:
 Sandringham Yacht Club: Finn
 Elwood Sailing Club: 12m2 Sharpie
 Royal St. Kilda Yacht Club: Star
 Royal Brighton Yacht Club: Dragon
 Royal Yacht Club of Victoria: 5.5 Metre
 The Royal St. Kilda Yacht Club was also the Sailing Headquarters
 Thirty-five Finn boats were built by a Melbourne firm of yacht builders. Other than in Helsinki, they were cold moulded shells of Queensland maple veneer. The mast and boom were of sitka spruce.
 The weather, throughout the series, was fine, with moderate sea breezes and pleasant sunshine. Except on 29 November th when the races in the Finn were postponed, several 12m2 Meter Sharpies capsized, only 5 out of 13 Sharpies could finish and the 5.5 Metre's of the Soviet Union and South Africa were dismasted.
 The courses were set by the Royal Australian Navy. The vessels: H.M.A.S. Warramunga, H.M.A.S. Swan and H.M.A.S. Sprightly acted as starting vessels.

 Sailors 
During the sailing regattas at the 1956 Summer Olympics among others the following persons were competing in the various classes:
 , Paul Elvstrøm in the Finn won his third consecutive Gold medal
 , Bruce Kirby in the Finn, yacht designer of the Olympic Laser.
 , Peter Mander won the first New Zealand Olympic gold medal in the 12m2 Sharpie, became later president of the New Zealand Yachting Federation.
 , Graham Hargrave Mann helmed the dragon Bluebottle'' the wedding gift to Her Majesty the Queen.
 , Jock Sturrock in the 5.5 Metres, won Australia's first medal in Olympic sailing. Later skipper of "Gretel" and "Dame Pattie", the first two Australian challengers for the America's Cup.
 , Prince of Thailand, Prinz Bhanubanda Bira in the Star

Notes 
World Sailing 1956 Olympic Microsite

References 
 

 

 
1956 Summer Olympics events
1956
1956 in sailing
Sailing competitions in Australia